Evangeline; or, The Belle of Acadia is a musical Extravaganza, with music by Edward E. Rice (arranged and orchestrated by John J. Braham) and lyrics and book by J. Cheever Goodwin. It was a comedy loosely based on Henry Wadsworth Longfellow's 1847 serious epic poem Evangeline. The title character is a young American maiden of French Acadian stock, who is forced to leave her home and is separated from her beloved. A notary stalks her, holding a secret will that may prevent her from gaining her inheritance.

The extravaganza debuted at Niblo's Garden in New York City on July 27, 1874, and received many revivals throughout the late 19th century.

Background 
Rice funded the musical's original production, which played for a limited run of 16 performances, followed by a successful tour. The original cast included Lizzie Harold and Ione Burke alternating in the title role, as well as James Dunn, W. H. Crane as LeBlanc, Connie Thompson in the trouser role of Gabriel, and Louis Mestayer (in drag) as Gabriel's aunt Catherine.

Although the musical's initial run was only modestly successful, it was revised and received a successful production in Boston the following year. Young comedians Henry E. Dixey and Richard Golden achieved their breakthroughs as the two halves of the dancing heifer, and Lillian Russell was in the chorus in 1880. The show was revived and toured throughout the late 19th century, accumulating a total of more than 3,000 performances. Among other revivals, it was given a successful Broadway revival in 1885, running for 252 performances. In this, Fay Templeton made her professional stage debut playing Gabriel, and Irene Verona played the title role. The only musical that fared better during that period was The Black Crook.

Though the show was originally conceived in three acts, various condensed two act versions appeared that eliminated the Arizona act and moved the dancing heifer scene from the finale to the end of act one. This is the only version of the show that has survived, because the script for the final act was lost.

Synopsis

Young Evangeline (or Eva) is an American girl of French Acadian stock, who becomes betrothed to her beloved, Gabriel. She comes to harbor some deserting sailors, and she and her companions are arrested for this crime by Captain Dietrich of the British Army, who intends to send her to France by ship for imprisonment in the Bastille. She is separated from Gabriel. Her friend Eulalie hopes for women's rights. The ship carrying her, her companions and her beautiful, dancing heifer runs aground off the coast of a diamond-rich African country, ruled by savage King Boorioboola Gha. 

A series of lovesick wanderings and episodes ensue, including a meeting with a monster whale and a balloon flight to Arizona's uncharted Indian territory. Evangeline is pursued, wherever she goes by the foolhardy Le Blanc, an Acadian notary, who holds a secret will that will legally divert Evangeline's inheritance to himself if she signs a marriage contract, an event that is repeatedly, ludicrously interrupted. All ends happily.

Musical numbers
Act 1
We Must Be Off 	
One Moment, Pray – Gabriel
There's a Man – Gabriel and Chorus
I'm a Fascinating Notary – LeBlanc
Thinking, Love, of Thee – Evangeline
Into the Water We Go – Evangeline, Eulalie, Catherine, Rose and Marie
She's Saved! She's Saved! 	
My Love and I – Gabriel
Sammy Smug – LeBlanc and Chorus
My Heart – Evangeline
Golden Chains – Evangeline and Gabriel
I Hope It Won't Happen Again – LeBlanc
In Us You See 	
He Says She Must Go 	
My Thoughts Are Far Away – Evangeline

Act 2
Clink! Clank! 	
We Are Off (to Seek for Eva) – Catherine, and LeBlanc
Let's Quietly Steal Away 	
Sweet the Song of Birds – Gabriel and Evangeline
I Like It, Don't You? – Gabriel
Twelve O'Clock, and All Is Well 	
Prowling 'Round the Diamond Fields 	
She's Acquitted, (He's Outwitted) 

Act 3	
Fie Upon You! Fie! – Evangeline
(We Are the) Six Miserable Ruffians 	
Does She Love Me? – Gabriel
O Gabriel, My Best Beloved – Evangeline
Goodnight to One and All 	
Homeward Bound 	
Source: IBDB listing for the 1885 Broadway revival

References

1870s musicals
Musicals based on poems
Adaptations of works by Henry Wadsworth Longfellow